Sarigamalu is a 1993 Indian Telugu-language musical drama film written by Hariharan, and directed by Kranthi Kumar. It is a remake of Hariharan's 1992 Malayalam film Sargam. The film stars Vineeth (in his first Telugu film), Manoj K. Jayan, and Rambha, while J. V. Somayajulu, P. J. Sarma, and Tanikella Bharani play supporting roles.

Plot 
Kitappa is the son of Sathyavathi. Kitappa has suffered from epilepsy since his childhood. He is rough and violent in his character and is feared by all in the village. Kalidasu is his classmate despite being two years younger and develops a special bond with Kitappa from childhood. Kali always accompanies Kuttan and carries iron keys to assist him in case the seizure develops. Both Kali and Kitappa grow up to be unsuccessful in their respective lives, and Kali is criticised for this by his father, who is a well-known classical singer but has himself not been financially successful. Kali has had a liking for music, but discourages him from music and persuades him into a professional degree course. Kuttan, meanwhile, had frequent epileptic seizures and is a nuisance in both his home and the village, despite seeking various medical treatments.

Unknown to his father, Kalidasu has a natural talent as a singer and has abundant raw talent, which he displays at the local temple. Jyothi who is a student of Kali's father and falls for Kali after she hears him singing. Kali, though initially reluctant towards Jyothi, soon develops a passionate relationship with her based on the mutual interest in music. Kitappa discloses to Kali that he is the only person who loves him, and they reaffirm their brotherly love for each other. Meanwhile, local expert advises that the only treatment for Kitappa is to get married. Sathyavathi amma plans to get as a wife for Kitappa. Kitappa agrees to this, unbeknownst about the affair between Kali and Jyothi and persuades Kali to forget Jyothi and leave the village for Kitappa's sake. Kitappa is devastated after coming to know about everything after their marriage and commits suicide.

Years later, an ageing Sathyavathi alls for Kali, who has grown up to be a well-known singer in India, to pay a visit to her. Kali's visit to the village and subsequent happenings form the rest of the story. Meanwhile, yothi is paralysed and unable to speak probably from the shock of her forced marriage and then the subsequent suicide of her husband Kitappa. When Kalidasu sings "Raga Sudha Rasa.." for Jyothi, then hearing his voice, Jyothi attempts to sing along. Soon, she displays signs of getting cured, and now, Sathyavathi passes on, relieved that Jyothi can be reunited with Kali

Cast 
Vineeth as Kalidasu  
Manoj K. Jayan as Kitappa  
Rambha as Jyothi 
J. V. Somayajulu as Kalidasu's father
P. J. Sarma
Tanikella Bharani

Production
S. S. Rajamouli worked as assistant director to Kranthi Kumar in this film.

Soundtrack 
The soundtrack was composed by Bombay Ravi, for which the lyrics were penned by Veturi. The songs were well received.

References

External links 
 

1990s musical drama films
1990s Telugu-language films
Telugu remakes of Malayalam films
1993 drama films
1993 films
Films about classical music and musicians
Films about teacher–student relationships
Indian musical drama films
Indian nonlinear narrative films